Paul Helm is a Reformed British philosopher and theologian. Helm was born in 1940.  He taught at Regent College, having served as the first incumbent of the J.I. Packer Chair of Theology there from 2001 to 2005. He also served as Professor of Theology at Highland Theological College, Scotland, from 2007 to 2010.

Education
Helm was educated (BA, MA) at Worcester College, Oxford, and began his teaching career at the University of Liverpool, where he rose from Lecturer to Senior Lecturer to Reader in Philosophy (1964–93). He was subsequently appointed as Professor of the History and Philosophy of Religion at King's College London (1993–2000).

Writings
His voluminous writings range over philosophy of religion, philosophical theology, historical theology and apologetics. The bulk of his work, however, has been on the doctrine of God (Eternal God, Clarendon, 1988; The Providence of God, IVP, 1993), religious belief (Belief Policies, Cambridge, 1994; Faith and Understanding, Eerdmans, 1997; Faith with Reason, Oxford, 2000), and the thought of John Calvin (Calvin and the Calvinists, Banner of Truth, 1982; John Calvin's Ideas, Oxford, 2004; Calvin: A Guide for the Perplexed, T & T Clark, 2008; Calvin at the Centre, Oxford, 2010). Helm has debated Christian apologist William Lane Craig on Calvinism and Molinism.

Among his smaller works is The Callings: The Gospel in the World, Banner of Truth, 1987, which shows that instead of dividing life into 'spiritual' and 'secular' compartments every moment of it can be lived fully to the glory of God.

References

Living people
British Christian theologians
Alumni of Worcester College, Oxford
Academics of the University of Liverpool
Academics of King's College London
20th-century Calvinist and Reformed theologians
Calvinist and Reformed philosophers
Christian apologists
English Calvinist and Reformed theologians
English male non-fiction writers
Year of birth missing (living people)